The Milwaukee Wave is an American professional indoor soccer team based in Milwaukee, Wisconsin. Founded in 1984, they have been the oldest continuously operating professional soccer team in the United States and are seven-time league champions, most recent being the 2018–19 champions of the Major Arena Soccer League.

The team plays their games at the UW–Milwaukee Panther Arena. The team colors are black and yellow.

History
The team was founded on August 3, 1984, as a member of the American Indoor Soccer Association and played in every season and incarnation of that league (see MISL). They have also played in the Xtreme Soccer League and the third version of the MISL.  The team is currently a member of the Major Arena Soccer League.  Milwaukee also hosted the 2003 and 2006 MISL II All-Star Games.

Keith Tozer was the team's coach for 21 years before leaving to become United States national futsal team head coach.  While with the Wave, he was the all-time winningest coach in North American indoor soccer, with six league championships and more than 700 wins.

The Wave played in the first season of the Xtreme Soccer League in the 2008 – 2009 season, but moved to the new Major Indoor Soccer League for the 2009–2010 season.

After the 2013–2014 season, the team announced that it was leaving the MISL along with five other teams and join the MASL.

In 2014 the ownership group ROC Ventures, headed by Mike Zimmerman, became a partner in the team's ownership.

Just before the 2014–15 season began, the Wave replaced their traditional green artificial turf with a black turf to match the team's colors and marketing strategy. Reception by fans and the press was mixed but generally positive.

Players

Active roster

Inactive roster

2022–23 transfers

Transfers in

Transfers out

2022–23 matches

Wave Hall of Fame inductees

Retired numbers
 5 –  Peter Knezic
 11 –  Steve Morris
 27 –  Victor Nogueira
 13 –  Michael King
 17 –  Todd Dusosky
 19 –  Troy Dusosky

Other notable former players
  Brian Loftin
  Jimmy Banks

Year-by-year

* Regular season ended early due to the COVID-19 pandemic

Head coaches

* Keith Tozer missed parts of the 1997–98 & 1999–00 season coaching the US Futsal team. Both times, Art Kramer filled in.

Owners
  Luis Antonio Ramos - Tony (1984)
  Ron Creten, Wayne Lueders, Dr. Christiansen (1985–87)
  Michael H. Bazelon (1987–2002)
  Charles Krause (2002–09)
  James Lindenberg (2009–2013)
  Sue Black (2013–2014)
  Mike Zimmerman (2014–present)

Arenas
 MECCA Auditorium 1984–1988
 Bradley Center 1988–2003
 UW–Milwaukee Panther Arena 2003–present

See also
 Milwaukee Wave United (former sister outdoor A-League squad in the early 2000s)

References

External links
 

 
1984 establishments in Wisconsin
American Indoor Soccer Association teams
Association football clubs established in 1984
Indoor soccer clubs in the United States
Major Arena Soccer League teams
Major Indoor Soccer League (2001–2008) teams
Major Indoor Soccer League (2008–2014) teams
National Professional Soccer League (1984–2001) teams
Xtreme Soccer League teams
Soccer clubs in Wisconsin